Coral Reef Senior High School is a secondary school located at 10101 S.W. 152nd Street in Richmond Heights, Florida, United States. The principal is Nicole Bergé-MacInnes. Coral Reef is locally known as "Miami's Mega Magnet School" since it offers six different magnet programs.

According to Newsweeks list of the 1,000 Top U.S. Schools in 2008, the school was ranked at 19th in the nation, making it 4th in the state of Florida at the time. In 2007, 2006 and 2005, it had ranked 22nd, 29th and 13th, respectively. This ranking is based on a ratio devised by Jay Mathews, which takes the number of Advanced Placement or International Baccalaureate tests taken by all students at a school in that school year and divides it by the number of graduating seniors. Coral Reef is currently ranked No.134 of the top high schools in the nation.

History

The school does not primarily serve the surrounding neighborhoods, but instead takes applications from middle school students all over the county. Selection is done via a lottery system for all magnet programs except for Visual & Performing Arts, for which acceptance is based on ability; students must audition for this program. Most students living around the Coral Reef area attend Miami Palmetto Senior High School or Miami Killian Senior High School.

Coral Reef has received an "A" grade for its performance on the FCAT examination on ten occasions since the annual test was first administered in 1998.

Coral Reef has three publications: the newspaper, Baitline, their yearbook, Tsunami, and the school's literary magazine, Elysium.  The newspaper is published monthly while the yearbook and literary magazine are both published annually.  The daily morning newscast, CRTV Live (originally known as Cudavision, and later adapted to include the channel number as Cudavision 21), airs on closed-circuit channel 21.

Coral Reef has six different magnets: International Baccalaureate, Health Sciences, Business & Finance, Legal & Public Affairs, Agriscience & Engineering Technology, and Visual & Performing Arts.

Athletics 
In the 2019-2020 marching season, the Barracuda Marching Band won straight superiors at the Marching Band Music Performance Assessment with their show "Storms of Africa" by Gary P. Gilroy and Shawn Glyde.

In the 2021-2022 school year, the Barracuda Band won the Otto J. Kraushaar Award for achieving straight superiors at the Marching Band Music Performance Assessment with their show "Pirates!" by Gary P. Gilroy and Shawn Glyde, straight superiors at the District Concert Band Music Performance Assessment, and straight superiors at the State Concert Band Music Performance Assessment.

Demographics
Coral Reef is 49% Hispanic (of any race), 31% White non-Hispanic, 25% Black, 5% Asian, and 5% other races.

Notable people

Alumni
JD Natasha, singer
Jessica Darrow, actress/singer, Disney’s Encanto
Ricky Ubeda, dancer and winner on Season 11 of So You Think You Can Dance

Faculty
David Menasche, author

See also 
Miami-Dade County Public Schools
Education in the United States

References

External links 
Coral Reef High School Web Page
Miami-Dade County Public Schools
Barracuda Band Web Page
Coral Reef High School YouTube Page
Barracuda Band YouTube Page
Coral Reef High School Instagram Page
Visual and Performing Arts Academy Instagram Page
Barracuda Band Instagram Page
Barracuda Jazz Band Instagram Page

Magnet schools in Florida
Miami-Dade County Public Schools
Educational institutions established in 1997
High schools in Miami-Dade County, Florida
Public high schools in Florida
1997 establishments in Florida